Solid Silver is the eighth album by American psychedelic rock band Quicksilver Messenger Service and their mid-1970s comeback album, reuniting the band's entire core lineup.

Though the album charted slightly higher than their previous two releases, briefly denting the Top 100 on the Billboard 200, this would be the last Quicksilver album until Gary Duncan resurrected the Quicksilver name in 1986 with the album Peace by Piece and again in the 1990s with several albums.

Track listing
Side one
"Gypsy Lights" (Gary Duncan) – 3:40
"Heebie Jeebies" (John Cipollina) – 4:15
"Cowboy on the Run" (Dino Valenti) – 3:13
"I Heard You Singing" (David Freiberg, Robert Hunter) – 3:48
"Worryin' Shoes" (Valenti) – 3:25
Side two
"The Letter" (Valenti) – 4:06
"They Don't Know" (Duncan) – 3:54
"Flames" (Cipollina, Valenti) – 4:20
"Witches' Moon" (Valenti) – 2:59
"Bittersweet Love" (Valenti, Duncan) - 4:23

Personnel
 Gary Duncan –  electric and pedal steel guitars, vocals
 John Cipollina - electric and Hawaiian steel guitars, vocals
 Dino Valenti – guitar, vocals
 David Freiberg – bass, vocals
 Greg Elmore – drums

Additional personnel

 Nicky Hopkins – piano
 Pete Sears – piano
 Michael Lewis – piano, organ, ARP synthesizer
 Skip Olson – bass
 Mario Cipollina – bass
 Kathi McDonald – vocals

Charts
 Album

Billboard (United States)

References

Quicksilver Messenger Service albums
1975 albums
Capitol Records albums